Ilium or Ilion, also known as Troja (Τροΐα), was a city of ancient Epirus. It is mentioned in the Aeneid of Virgil as a foundation of Helenus after the Trojan War in the land of the Chaonia.

Its site is located near the modern village of Despotiko in Greece. The village was formerly known as Kretsounista.

See also
List of cities in ancient Epirus

References 

Populated places in ancient Epirus
Thesprotia
Former populated places in Greece